Nguyễn Trọng Long (born 6 January 2000) is a Vietnamese professional footballer who plays for V.League 1 side  Công An Hà Nội.

Honours
Vietnam U23
 Southeast Asian Games: 2021

References

External links
 

2000 births
Living people
People from Thanh Hóa province
Vietnamese footballers
Vietnam youth international footballers
Association football midfielders
V.League 1 players
Competitors at the 2021 Southeast Asian Games
Southeast Asian Games competitors for Vietnam